Shawn C. Martinbrough is an American comic book artist. The long-time artist for Robert Kirkman's Thief of Thieves, Martinbrough is known for his film noir-influenced drawing style.

Biography 
Growing up in the Bronx, Martinbrough's early influences included Alex Toth, Frank Miller, and David Mazzucchelli.

Martinbrough graduated from Fiorello H. LaGuardia High School in 1989. He then attended the School of Visual Arts. Martinbrough got his first professional work — a painted illustration for Marvel Comics — while still a student at SVA.

Early in his career, Martinbrough worked for minority-led publishing imprint Milestone Media, primarily as an inker. In 1993, he inked over John Paul Leon on early issues of the Milestone property Static. He followed that by inking virtually the entire run of DC/Milestone's Shadow Cabinet, again over Leon's pencils. Martinbrough and Leon teamed up again for DC's 1997 reboot of Challengers of the Unknown, with Martinbrough inking issues 1-9 (and inking covers through issue #17).

Martinbrough was given his first ongoing penciling duties starting with the DC Comics series The Creeper, in 1997–1998.

In 2000–2001, Martinbrough and writer Greg Rucka were the creative team of Detective Comics (starting with issue #742 [March 2000]). During their run, they created the Sasha Bordeaux character in issue #751 (Dec. 2000), as well as the villains Kyle Abbot and Able Crown. Rucka and Martinbrough's run was collected in Batman: New Gotham, Volumes 1 and 2.

Following his stint on Detective Comics, in 2002 Martinbrough signed on with Marvel Comics to illustrate writer Geoff Johns' four-issues limited series Morlocks.

In 2005, Martinbrough and writer Gary Phillips produced Angeltown, a five-issue limited series published by Vertigo Comics. The story is told in the blaxploitation idiom, with nods to the detective stories of Chester Himes and Walter Mosley. In 2011, the series was reprinted by Moonstone Books as Angeltown: The Nate Hollis Investigations.

In 2007, Watson-Guptill Publications and The Nielsen Company published Martinbrough's How to Draw Noir Comics: The Art and Technique of Visual Storytelling.

In 2009, Martinbrough teamed with writers Mike Benson and Adam Glass on the four-issue limited series Luke Cage Noir.

Since 2012, Martinbrough has been the artist of the monthly series Thief of Thieves, co-written by Robert Kirkman and published by Image Comics/Skybound Entertainment. Kirkman chose Martinbrough because of his "cinematic flair" and ability to "portray characters realistically."

In 2018, New York's Society of Illustrators held the exhibition "Shawn Martinbrough: Storyteller".

Personal life 
Martinbrough and his wife Ayanna Ross were married in April 2017. They live in Alexandria, Virginia.

Awards 
2010 Glyph Comics Awards Fan Award for Best Comic for Luke Cage Noir

Bibliography

Comics 
As artist unless otherwise noted.
 (inker) Static #4, 8, 10–12 (DC/Milestone, 1993)
 (inker) Shadow Cabinet #1–11, 14–17 (DC/Milestone, 1994–1995)
 Man Against Time #3 (Image Comics, 1996)
 (inker) Challengers of the Unknown #1–9 (DC, 1997)
 The Creeper #1–11, #1000000 (DC, 1997–1998)
 Detective Comics #742–764 (DC, 2000–2001)
 Morlocks #1–4 (Marvel Comics, 2002)
 Vertigo Pop! Bangkok #1-4 (Vertigo/DC Comics, 2003)
 (with Jock) Losers #1–12 (Vertigo X, 2004)
 Angeltown #1–5 (Vertigo, January – May 2005)
 World War Hulk: Front Line #2–5 (Marvel, 2007)
 Luke Cage Noir #1-4 (Marvel Noir, 2009)
 Black Panther: The Most Dangerous Man Alive #525, 526, 529 (Marvel, 2012)
 Thief of Thieves #1-present (Image Comics/Skybound, 2012–present)
 Hellboy and the B.P.R.D. #16 (Dark Horse Comics, 2017)

Books 
 How to Draw Noir Comics: The Art and Technique of Visual Storytelling (Watson-Guptill Publications / The Nielsen Company, 2007)

References

Notes

Sources consulted 
 Dougall, Alastair, and Matt Forbeck, editors. (2014). Batman: A Visual History. London, United Kingdom: Dorling Kindersley. ISBN

External links
 
 
 "How one 'Black Panther' comic artist is changing perceptions  Shawn Martinbrough," TEDxMidAtlantic (March 1, 2018)

Living people
Artists from the Bronx
Fiorello H. LaGuardia High School alumni
School of Visual Arts alumni
African-American comics creators
People from the Bronx
Year of birth missing (living people)
21st-century African-American people